{{DISPLAYTITLE:C23H30N2O5}}
The molecular formula C23H30N2O5 (molar mass: 414.50 g/mol) may refer to:

 Deacetylvindoline
 7-Hydroxymitragynine
 Mitragynine pseudoindoxyl

Molecular formulas